The Tano Nimri or Tano Nimiri Forest Reserve is found in Ghana. It was established in 1935. This site is 206 km2. It is thought that species presence is confirmed within this reserve (Magnuson et al. 2003)

References

Notes
Magnuson, L., Adu-Nsiah, M., Kpelle, D. (2003) Ghana. In: Kormos, R., Boesch, C., Bakarr, M., Butynski, T.,
eds, West African Chimpanzees: Status Survey and Conservation Action Plan. IUCN/SSC Primate
Specialist Group. IUCN, Gland, Switzerland. pp. 111–116.

Protected areas established in 1935
Forest reserves of Ghana